"Who Will Answer?", released as a single in November 1967, is the title track of the 1968 album Who Will Answer? by the adult contemporary singer Ed Ames. Originally written as the Spanish song "Aleluya No. 1" by the Philippines-born Spanish singer-songwriter, poet and painter Luis Eduardo Aute, it was adapted into an English-language version with new lyrics by songwriter Sheila Davis.

Background
Luis Eduardo Aute's Spanish-language song  "Aleluya No. 1" became a number-one hit in Spain in spring 1967 and was well received in other Spanish-speaking countries. Subsequently, Eddie Deane, of the  music publisher Sunbury Music, brought the song to Music Row executive Jim Foglesong, who worked with American singer Ed Ames. Deane played the Spanish instrumental version for Foglesong while reciting songwriter Sheila Davis' new English-language lyrics. Ames agreed to record it, and a recording session was held in November 1967 at RCA Victor's Music Center of the World Studios in Hollywood, California. It was arranged and conducted by Perry Botkin, Jr.

Recorded in stereo as RCA Victor 9400  with the B-side "My Love Is Gone from Me", the single shipped to distributors on November 24, 1967. On the previous evening, Ames performed the song on the NBC late-night television talk show The Tonight Show Starring Johnny Carson.

A hit for Ames, the song reached #19 on the Billboard Hot 100 music singles chart, and #6 on that industry trade magazine's Adult Contemporary chart. It was Ames' fourth charting single that year, following "My Cup Runneth Over", "Time, Time", and "When the Snow is on the Roses". The song later appeared as the title track of Ames' 1968 album Who Will Answer?.

Critical assessment
Billboard magazine, naming the song its "Record of the Week", praised the topical lyrics and the unusual musical combination of "Gregorian-like chant ... Johann Sebastian Bach and ... hard rock", saying the song "expresses the urgent feelings of our times and deals with such meaningful subject matter as nuclear war, apathy, religious discontent and the underlying confusion of today's generation." The magazine's "Spotlight Singles" reviewer that week said, "With appeal for all programming and buyers, the vital lyric message based upon today's world situation must be heard throughout."

The song reflects contemporary topics and anxieties of the times, with references to such subject matter as nuclear holocaust ("'Neath the spreading mushroom tree / The world revolves in apathy  as overhead, a row of specks (the specks being bomber planes in the sky) roars on, drowned out by discotheques (humankind being so apathetic to the world blowing up that they focus on frivolous things like dancing and partying) And if a secret button's pressed / because one man has been outguessed / Who will answer?"), drug use ("In the rooms with darkened shades / the scent of sandalwood pervades. / The colored thoughts in muddled heads / Reclining in the rumpled beds / Of unmade dreams that can't come true...."), war ("On a strange and distant hill / A young man's lying very still. / His arms will never hold his child / Because a bullet running wild / Has struck him down...."), divorce ("Side by side two people stand / Together vowing, hand-in-hand / That love's imbedded in their hearts / But soon an empty feeling starts / To overwhelm their hollow lives"), and suicide ("High upon a lonely ledge / a figure teeters near the edge / And jeering crowds collect below / To egg him on with, 'Go, man, go!'") culminating in an existential question: "If the soul is darkened / By a fear it cannot name / If the mind is baffled / When the rules don't fit the game / Who will answer?"

The liner notes on the single state that, "As music speaks for the times, it also changes with the times. In Who Will Answer? we find contemporary lyrics that reflect the feelings and concerns of today's world.  To the music of Gregorian-type chanting, Baroque harpsichord figures and hard rock, Sheila Davis' penetrating poem can hardly be considered of the 'moon-June' variety."

The middle stanza is spoken by Ames, rather than sung.

References

1967 singles
1967 songs
Ed Ames songs
RCA Victor singles